The 2019–20 Bendigo Spirit season is the 13th season for the franchise in the Women's National Basketball League (WNBL).

This is the Spirit's first season under new head coach, Tracy York, who overtook the role from Simon Pritchard after he spent four seasons in the position.

Roster

Standings

Results

Pre-season

Regular season

Awards

In-season

Club Awards

References

External links
Bendigo Spirit Official website

2019–20 WNBL season
WNBL seasons by team
2019–20 in Australian basketball
Basketball,Bendigo Spirit
Basketball,Bendigo Spirit